This is a list of hospitals in Jersey sorted by hospital name.

 Jersey General Hospital, St Helier
Nightingale Wing, St Lawrence (temporary, 2020–present)
 Overdale Hospital, St Helier
St Saviour's Hospital, St Saviour

External links 
 Hospitals and emergency treatment

Hospitals